Dana Antal (born April 19, 1977 in Saskatoon, Saskatchewan) is a women's ice hockey player.  She won a gold medal with Canada at the 2002 Winter Olympics in Salt Lake City.  Prior to joining the Canadian national team, she played collegiate hockey for Cornell University.  In her first season, she was named the Ivy League Rookie of the Year, and was the team's leading scorer. Antal also played for the Calgary Oval X-Treme in the Western Women's Hockey League.

Playing career

Minor hockey
Growing up in Esterhazy, Saskatchewan, Antal played minor hockey on local boys' teams until bantam (15 & under), as at the time, there were no girls' teams in the area.

College hockey
After completing her minor hockey career, Antal was offered a scholarship to play hockey at Cornell University.

Club hockey
On March 22, 1998, Dana Antal scored at 5:31 of a 10-minute overtime period on a pass from Jennifer Botterill as Team Alberta (represented by the Calgary Oval X-Treme) defeated Team Ontario (represented by the Beatrice Aeros) by a 3-2 mark to win the Esso Nationals.  In the tournament, Antal scored two goals and added an assist at the games. She scored a goal in the 2003 Esso Women's National Hockey Championship to help Team Alberta win the Abby Hoffman Cup.

International play
Antal was a member of the Canadian National Team that won gold at the Women’s World Hockey Championships in 2001. She was selected to the team in 2000 but was unable to play. She was a member of the Canadian Olympic Team that won a gold medal at the 2002 Winter Olympics in Salt Lake City.

Awards and honours
Most Sportsmanlike, 1998 Esso National championships
Player of the game, 2003 Esso Women's National Hockey Championship

References

1977 births
Living people
Calgary Oval X-Treme players
Canadian women's ice hockey forwards
Cornell Big Red women's ice hockey players
Sportspeople from Saskatoon
Ice hockey players at the 2002 Winter Olympics
Medalists at the 2002 Winter Olympics
Olympic gold medalists for Canada
Olympic ice hockey players of Canada
Olympic medalists in ice hockey
Ice hockey people from Saskatchewan
People from Esterhazy, Saskatchewan